Taina Vasilyevna Tudegesheva (19 November 1957 – 15 February 2022) was a Russian poet who composed in Russian and Shorian languages.

Life and career 
She started composing poetry as an adolescent, and mainly composed her works in Shorian language. 

Tudegesheva made her literary debut in 1998, with the collection Шория моя ("My Shorya"). Poems by her have been published in several literary magazines and anthologies. She was part of the Union of Russian Writers from 1999. 

Beyond her literary activity, Tudegesheva was the founder of the museum of Shorian culture history and served as deputy director of the Novokuznetsk City Palace of Culture. She died on 15 February 2022, at the age of 64.

References
 

1957 births
2022 deaths 
20th-century Russian poets
21st-century Russian poets
Maxim Gorky Literature Institute alumni
People from Kemerovo Oblast
Russian poets
Soviet poets